Nowopole may refer to the following places:
Nowopole, Lesser Poland Voivodeship (south Poland)
Nowopole, Mława County in Masovian Voivodeship (east-central Poland)
Nowopole, Żuromin County in Masovian Voivodeship (east-central Poland)